The Geelong West Giants, nicknamed the Giants, is an Australian rules football and netball club based in the suburb of North Geelong, Victoria. The club fields teams in both the Geelong Football League and Geelong & District Football League.

History 
The Geelong area's first new club since 1990 was born out of the merger of the town's two oldest teams, Geelong West St Peters Football Club (the Roosters, also known as "Red West") and Geelong West Sporting Club (the Cheetahs, also known as "Blue West"). With both Geelong West clubs having sustained periods of minimal success in recent years, it was decided by both sets of members to pursue a merged entity. The Giants now field senior football teams in the GFL and GDFL, both respective competitions of their predecessors, while also operating junior football, senior netball and junior netball teams.while also having a mixed all abilities netball team to support people with disabilities.

Initially, the Giants name was to be used as part of a rebrand by the Roosters to align with AFL club Greater Western Sydney Giants, given the similarities between the Roosters' oft-used abbreviation, GWSP, and the AFL Giants' abbreviation, GWS. Roosters officials met with officials from the GWS Giants in July 2016 to facilitate the move, with the potential to incorporate the Cheetahs into the new club should it be agreed upon by all parties. Later that month, members of the Roosters voted unanimously to rebrand the club under the new moniker and to continue fielding teams in their current respective leagues, the GFL and GDFL. A fortnight later, the merger became a formality as an "overwhelming majority" of Cheetahs members voted to join forces with the Roosters, to create what then Cheetahs executive chairman Paul Westcott described as a "super-club".

Results
In their first year as a merged entity the Giants in the GFL won 6 games and finished 10 out of twelve clubs. In the GDFL they won 8 games and a draw to finish 6th out of twelve clubs.

References

External links
 Official website

Australian rules football clubs established in 2016
Australian rules football clubs in Geelong
2016 establishments in Australia
Geelong Football League clubs
Geelong & District Football League clubs
Netball teams in Geelong